Parliamentary elections were held in the Faroe Islands on 17 November 1988.

Results

Elections in the Faroe Islands
Faroes
1988 in the Faroe Islands
November 1988 events in Europe
Election and referendum articles with incomplete results